Unai Veiga González (born 9 October 1998) is a Spanish footballer who plays as a midfielder for Unionistas de Salamanca CF, on loan from UD Las Palmas.

Club career
Born in Portugalete, Biscay, Basque Country, Veiga played for Athletic Bilbao and Danok Bat CF before joining Real Sociedad's youth setup in June 2014. He made his senior debut with the latter's C-team on 26 August 2017, playing the last 25 minutes in a 0–2 Tercera División away loss against SCD Durango.

Veiga scored his first senior goal on 23 September 2017, in a 2–1 win at SD Deusto, and scored a brace in a 4–0 away success over Sodupe UC the following 14 April. After scoring seven goals for the C's, he first appeared with the reserves on 13 May 2018 by starting in a 3–1 away defeat of Peña Sport FC in the Segunda División B.

On 18 July 2019, after featuring regularly for the B-team, Veiga renewed his contract until 2021. He contributed with one goal in 18 appearances overall during the 2020–21 campaign, as his club returned to the Segunda División after 59 years.

On 3 June 2021, Veiga signed a three-year contract with UD Las Palmas in the second division. He made his professional debut on 3 October, coming on as a second-half substitute for Fabio González in a 4–1 home routing of FC Cartagena.

On 4 August 2022, Veiga was loaned to Primera Federación side Algeciras CF for the season. In January 2023, he joined Unionistas de Salamanca CF until the end of the season.

References

External links

1998 births
Living people
People from Portugalete
Spanish footballers
Footballers from the Basque Country (autonomous community)
Association football midfielders
Segunda División players
Segunda División B players
Tercera División players
Real Sociedad C footballers
Real Sociedad B footballers
UD Las Palmas players
Algeciras CF footballers
Unionistas de Salamanca CF players